In Blue Waters is a collection of three novellas and eight short stories by Henry De Vere Stacpoole, first published in 1917 by Hutchinson and Co, London. The collection includes the stories "In Blue Waters", "The Birth of Love", and "The Luck of Captain Slocum".

1917 short story collections
Works by Henry De Vere Stacpoole
Irish short story collections
British short story collections